Carruanthus peersii is from the Carruanthus genus of flowering plants from the ice plant family Aizoaceae.

Carruanthus peersii, like Carruanthus ringens, is a species native to South Africa.

Carruanthus peersii has green toothed leaves and yellow flowers. The succulent is hardy down to -5 Celius and can stand a variety of lighting conditions.

References

peersii
Taxa named by Louisa Bolus